Tomato black ring virus (TBRV) is a plant pathogenic virus of the family Secoviridae, that was first discovered in 1946.

Hosts
TBRV infects several hosts including:
Allium cepa
Allium porrum
Apium graveolens
Beta vulgaris var. saccharifera
Brassica napus var. napobrassica
Brassica rapa subsp. rapa
Capsicum
Cucumis sativus
Cynara cardunculus var. scolymus
Fragaria including Fragaria ananassa
Gladiolus hybrids
Lactuca sativa
Narcissus
Phaseolus vulgaris
Prunus persica
Ribes
Rubus including Rubus idaeus
Solanum lycopersicum
Solanum melongena
Solanum tuberosum
Vitis vinifera

References

External links
 ICTVdB—The Universal Virus Database: Tomato black ring virus
 Family Groups—The Baltimore Method

Nepoviruses
Viral plant pathogens and diseases
Potato diseases
Stone fruit tree diseases
Small fruit diseases
Viral grape diseases